Millersburg may refer to several places in the United States:

 Millersburg, Illinois, an unincorporated community in Mercer County
 Millersburg, Indiana, a town in Elkhart County
 Millersburg, Hamilton County, Indiana, an unincorporated community in Jackson Township
 Millersburg, Orange County, Indiana,  an unincorporated community in Stampers Creek Township
 Millersburg, Warrick County, Indiana, an unincorporated community in Campbell Township
 Millersburg, Iowa, a city in Iowa County
 Millersburg, Kentucky, a city in Bourbon County
 Millersburg, Michigan, a village in Presque Isle County
 Millersburg, Missouri
 Millersburg, Ohio, a village in Holmes County
 Millersburg, Oregon, a city in Linn County
 Millersburg, Pennsylvania, a borough in Dauphin County